Emmanuel Roman Morales (born April 29, 1997), better known by the ring name El Hijo del Vikingo, is a Mexican luchador (or professional wrestler) currently working for Lucha Libre AAA Worldwide, where he is the current AAA Mega Champion in his first reign.

Professional wrestling career
Vikingo made his debut on the independent circuit was defeated by Pequeno Cobra with Guerrerito de Plata, Memin Pinguin, Nube Negra, Pequeno Joker, Pequeno Kraneo, Alebrije and Vega Streetfighter.

Lucha Libre AAA Worldwide (2017–present) 
In 2017 he began working full-time for Lucha Libre AAA Worldwide (AAA), initially working in the first match of the night teaming with Concord and Octagoncito to defeat Bronco Gonzalez, Guerrero de Plata and Mini Abismo Negro. At Triplemanía XXV, El Hijo del Vikingo teamed with Angelikal and The Tigger to defeat Angel Mortal Jr., Tiger Boy and Villano III Jr. in the final of La Llave a la Gloria. That same night, he was named the winner of the tournament along with Ashley and Angelikal, but nevertheless, Director of Talent of AAA Vampiro announced that the fourteen finalists would all receive a contract with the promotion.

On November 18, 2018, El Hijo del Vikingo teamed with Angelikal and Laredo Kid to defeat El Nuevo Poder del Norte (Carta Brava Jr., Tito Santana and Mocho Cota Jr.), that same night the trio demanded a match for the AAA World Trios Championship. In December, at Guerra de Titanes, the trio (with Angelikal changing gimmicks to Myzteziz Jr. the same night). They would go on to be known as Los Jinetes del Aire (The Air Raiders). On June 9, 2019, Vikingo unsuccessfully challenged Laredo Kid for the AAA World Cruiserweight Championship. Prior to Triplemanía XXVIII, Laredo Kid vacated the AAA World Trios Championship in order to focus on his singles career following advice from La Parka and Golden Magic would replace him in the trio. At the event, the trio won the vacant AAA World Trios Championship in a three way match which included El Nuevo Poder del Norte and Las Fresas Salvajes (Pimpinela Escarlata, Mamba, and Máximo). Later in the year, Golden Magic would change his gimmick to Octagon Jr. At the 2019 Guerra de Titanes, Myzteziz Jr. and El Hijo del Vikingo unsuccessfully challenged AAA World Tag Team Champions Lucha Brothers (Fénix and Pentagón Jr.) in a match that also included Australian Suicide and Rey Horus. On February 22, 2020, Los Jinetes del Aire successfully defended the AAA World Trios Championship against Los Mercenarios (La Hiedra, Rey Escorpión and Taurus). The trio made a second successful defence on the May 2 episode of Major League Wrestling's Fusion against Injustice (Jordan Oliver, Kotto Brazil and Myron Reed).

On December 4, 2021 at Triplemanía Regia II, Vikingo defeated Samuray Del Sol, Bobby Fish, Jay Lethal and Bandido in a five-way match to win the vacant AAA Mega Championship.

Impact Wrestling (2018–2020) 
Due to AAA's alliance with American promotion Impact Wrestling, Vikingo made a special appearance on the January 12, 2019 edition of Impact Wrestling, which was taped January 11–12, 2019 at Mexico City's Frontón México Entertainment Center, was defeated by the Impact X Division Champion Rich Swann. Vikingo teamed up with Aero Star, Psycho Clown and Puma King in an Elimination Match where they defeated Eddie Edwards, Eli Drake, Fallah Bahh and Sami Callihan winning the Impact World Cup.

Personal life
Vikingo is a father to a son with his partner.

Championships and accomplishments 
 The Crash Lucha Libre
 The Crash Heavyweight Championship (1 time)
 Impact Wrestling
 Impact World Cup of Wrestling (2019) – with Aero Star, Puma King and Psycho Clown
 Lucha Libre AAA Worldwide
 AAA Mega Championship (1 time, current)
 AAA World Trios Championship (2 times) – with Laredo Kid & Myzteziz Jr. (1) and Golden Magic and Myzteziz Jr. (1)
 Llave a la Gloria tournament (2017) – with Ashley and Angelikal.
 Copa Antonio Peña (2019)
 Lucha Capital (2019 Men's)
 Copa Hijo del Perro Aguayo (2021)
 Pro Wrestling Illustrated
 Ranked No. 42 of the top 500 singles wrestlers in the PWI 500 in 2021
 Ranked No. 8 of the top 500 singles wrestlers in the PWI 500 in 2022
 Sports Illustrated
 Ranked No. 7 of the top 10 wrestlers in 2022
Warrior Wrestling
Warrior Wrestling Lucha Championship (1 time, current)
 Wrestling Observer Newsletter Awards
 Mexico MVP (2021, 2022)
 Non-Heavyweight MVP (2022)
 Best Flying Wrestler (2022)

References

External links

1997 births
Living people
Mexican male professional wrestlers
Professional wrestlers from Puebla
People from Puebla (city)
AAA World Trios Champions